Culloden is a settlement in southeastern Queens County, Prince Edward Island.

Named in honour of Culloden Moor, Inverness-shire, Scotland, the location of the Battle of Culloden.  A post office was opened in the community in 1906.

References

Communities in Queens County, Prince Edward Island